Michael Seamus Day is a member of the Massachusetts House of Representatives, sworn in January 2015. An attorney from Stoneham, Massachusetts, Day was elected as a Democrat to represent the 31st Middlesex district.

Education
Day graduated from Phillips Academy Andover and UMass-Amherst before earning his law degree from Georgetown University, where he attended the night division while working a full-time job in Washington, D.C.

See also
 2019–2020 Massachusetts legislature
 2021–2022 Massachusetts legislature

References

Democratic Party members of the Massachusetts House of Representatives
People from Stoneham, Massachusetts
Living people
Phillips Academy alumni
University of Massachusetts Amherst alumni
Georgetown University Law Center alumni
Year of birth missing (living people)
21st-century American politicians